Kristian Šekularac (born 7 December 2003) is a Swiss professional footballer who plays as a midfielder for  club Fulham. He is the great-nephew of Dragoslav Šekularac.

Club career
Šekularac was a youth player in Switzerland at Servette, before joining Juventus in Italy in January 2020. This move had family significance because five decades earlier, Juventus owner Gianni Agnelli had tried to sign his great-uncle Dragoslav Šekularac from Crvena Zvezda but the move was blocked by the Yugoslav state. Kristian played for Juventus U23 in the 2021–22 season.

In July 2022, Šekularac joined Fulham in England. In November, he was involved in the Fulham first team and was named in the match day squad for the Premier League match against Manchester United on 13 November.

International career
Šekularac played for the Swiss U16 international team from July 2018. In 2021 he was called up to the Swiss U18 team.

Personal life
Born in London, he has a Swiss passport, and is also eligible to play internationally for North Macedonia or Serbia. He is the grandson of footballer Mirko Šekularac, the younger brother of Yugoslav international footballer and famed football coach Dragoslav Šekularac.

References

2003 births
Living people
Swiss people of Serbian descent
Swiss people of Montenegrin descent
Swiss people of Macedonian descent
Footballers from Greater London
Swiss men's footballers
Association football midfielders
Servette FC players
Juventus F.C. players
Fulham F.C. players

Swiss expatriate footballers
Swiss expatriate sportspeople in Italy
Swiss expatriate sportspeople in England
Expatriate footballers in Italy
Expatriate footballers in England